Nicholas Alexander Denning (born 3 October 1978 in Ascot, Berkshire) is a former English cricketer active as a right-handed batsman who bowled right-arm fast-medium.

Playing career 

In 1999, Denning made his debut for Berkshire in the MCCA Knockout Trophy against the Kent Cricket Board.  In 2000, he made his Minor Counties Championship debut for the county against Dorset.  From 2000 to 2008, he represented the county in 29 Championship matches, the last of which came against Lincolnshire in the 2008 Championship final, which Berkshire won.  Furthermore, from 1999 to 2007, he represented the county in 11 MCCA Knockout Trophy matches, the last of which came against Wales Minor Counties.  Naylor also played 2 List-A matches for the county.  His first List-A match for Buckinghamshire came against Wales Minor Counties in the 2000 NatWest Trophy, with his second match coming against the Kent Cricket Board in the 2001 Cheltenham & Gloucester Trophy.

Additionally, he also played List-A matches for Berkshire.  His List-A debut for the county came against Lincolnshire in the 1st round of the 2002 Cheltenham & Gloucester Trophy which was played in 2001.  From 2001 to 2005, he represented the county in 5 List-A matches, with his final List-A match coming when Berkshire played Gloucestershire in the 2005 Cheltenham & Gloucester Trophy at Sonning Lane, Reading.

During the 2003 season he also played 3 List-A matches for Essex against the touring Pakistanis, the touring Zimabweans and finally against Glamorgan in the 2003 National League.  In his combined List-A career, he took 9 wickets at a bowling average of 34.66, with best figures of 3/22.

Coaching career 
Denning was Head Coach of Berkshire Women from 2006 to 2016, during which time they reached the T20 Championship Finals 3 times and won it once.
In January 2016, Denning was named as head coach of Hampshire Women cricket team as their inaugural coach for their Women's team. He was also appointed as head coach of Women's Cricket Super League team as the Southern Vipers.

References

External links
Nicholas Denning at Cricinfo
Nicholas Denning at CricketArchive

1978 births
Living people
People from Ascot, Berkshire
English cricketers
Berkshire cricketers
Essex cricketers
English cricket coaches